William of England may refer to the following monarchs of England and later the United Kingdom:
William I (–1087), usually known as William the Conqueror, King of England from 1066
William II of England (–1100), King of England from 1087
William III of England (1650–1702), also widely known as William of Orange, King of England from 1689
William IV (1765–1837), King of the United Kingdom from 1830

See also
 King William (disambiguation)
 Prince William (disambiguation)
 William of the United Kingdom (disambiguation)